In Greek mythology, Atrax  was believed to have been the founder and eponym of Atrax or Atracia, a city in ancient Thessaly.

Family 
Atrax was the son of the river god Peneus and Bura. He had three daughters: Hippodamia, wife of Pirithous; Caenis, who transformed into a male, Caeneus; and Damasippe, who was married to Cassandrus of Thrace.

Mythology 
Damasippe fell in love with her stepson Hebrus (Cassandrus' son by his first wife Crotonice); as he rejected all her advances, she took revenge on him by falsely accusing him of seducing her; Cassandrus believed the accusations and tried to kill Hebrus, who threw himself into the river Rhombus, which was subsequently renamed Hebrus.

Notes

References 

 Antoninus Liberalis, The Metamorphoses of Antoninus Liberalis translated by Francis Celoria (Routledge 1992). Online version at the Topos Text Project.
 Lucius Mestrius Plutarchus, Morals translated from the Greek by several hands. Corrected and revised by. William W. Goodwin, PH. D. Boston. Little, Brown, and Company. Cambridge. Press Of John Wilson and son. 1874. 5. Online version at the Perseus Digital Library.
 Publius Ovidius Naso, The Epistles of Ovid. London. J. Nunn, Great-Queen-Street; R. Priestly, 143, High-Holborn; R. Lea, Greek-Street, Soho; and J. Rodwell, New-Bond-Street. 1813. Online version at the Perseus Digital Library.
 Stephanus of Byzantium, Stephani Byzantii Ethnicorum quae supersunt, edited by August Meineike (1790-1870), published 1849. A few entries from this important ancient handbook of place names have been translated by Brady Kiesling. Online version at the Topos Text Project.

Children of Peneus
Thessalian mythology